South Fork Township may refer to:

South Fork Township, Fulton County, Arkansas
South Fork Township, Montgomery County, Arkansas
South Fork Township, Christian County, Illinois
South Fork Township, Delaware County, Iowa
South Fork Township, Jackson County, Iowa
South Fork Township, Wayne County, Iowa
South Fork Township, Kanabec County, Minnesota
South Fork Township, Audrain County, Missouri
South Fork Township, Howell County, Missouri
South Fork Township, Monroe County, Missouri
South Fork Township, Forsyth County, North Carolina
South Fork Township, Tyrrell County, North Carolina, in Tyrrell County, North Carolina
South Fork Township, Adams County, North Dakota

See also 

South Fork (disambiguation)

Township name disambiguation pages